Del Doc & Mac (the cover actually prints the names and photos in a somewhat convoluted manner, hence most discographies use the alphabetical listing) is the title of a recording by American folk music artists Doc Watson, Del McCoury and Mac Wiseman, released in 1998.

History
All three artists are well-known bluegrass musicians. Watson's long career in folk, blues and bluegrass has earned him numerous awards, amongst them seven Grammy Awards as well as a Lifetime Achievement Award. McCoury's Del McCoury Band is a Grammy Award-winning bluegrass band. Wiseman has been inducted into the International Bluegrass Music Hall of Honor and the Country Music Hall of Fame (2014).

Guests on Del Doc & Mac include Jerry Douglas on dobro and Alison Krauss on harmony vocals.

Reception

Writing for Allmusic, music critic Jana Pendragon wrote of the album "... this is a treasure created by three of very recognizable voices from the world of bluegrass music. And these Groovegrass Boyz never sounded better!... Emotionally satisfying, this is a special project within the scope of traditional American music." Allen Price highly praised the album, calling it "carved out a little piece of musical heaven."

Track listing
 "Little Green Valley" (Carson Robison) – 3:09
 "The Old Account" (Frank Graham) – 3:00
 "Speak To Me Little Darlin'" (Leslie York) – 1:40
 "New Moon Over My Shoulder" (Lee Blastic, Jimmie Davis, Ekko Whelan) – 3:46
 "Beauty Of My Dreams" (Del McCoury) – 2:24
 "I'll Sail My Ship Alone" (Henry Bernard, Morry Burns, Sydney Herman, Henry Thurston) – 2:12
 "When A Soldier Knocks" (Moon Mullican, Ernest Tubb, Lou Wayne) – 2:34
 "Live And Let Live" (Gene Sullivan) – 3:13
 "I've Endured" (Ola Belle Reed) – 2:22
 "Talk Of The Town" (Don Reno) – 2:26
 "Black Mountain Rag" (Traditional) – 2:55
 "I Wonder Where You Are Tonight" (Johnny Bond) – 3:27
 "More Pretty Girls Than One" (Arthur Smith) – 4:11

Personnel
Doc Watson – guitar, harmonica, vocals
Del McCoury – vocals, harmony vocals
Mac Wiseman – vocals, harmony vocals
Jack Lawrence – guitar
Mike Bub – bass
Jason Carter – fiddle
Jerry Douglas – dobro
Byron House – bass
Alison Krauss – harmony vocals
Ronnie McCoury – mandolin, harmony vocals
Gene Wooten – dobro
Production notes
Scott Rouse – producer
Gary Paczosa – engineer
Les Wax – mixing
Denny Purcell – mastering
Scott Rouse – design
Bishop James Morton – photography
Thud Rippington – executive producer
Ed Rode – photography, cover art concept
"Scott Rouse - cover art concept

References

1998 albums
Del McCoury albums
Doc Watson albums
Mac Wiseman albums
Sugar Hill Records albums